DRHS may refer to:
Damonte Ranch High School
Desert Ridge High School
Deep Run High School
Diamond Ranch High School
Digby Regional High School
Dalhousie Regional High School
Denmark Road High School